Vakhtang Blagidze (born July 23, 1954) is a wrestler from Ozurgeti, Georgia. He was Olympic gold medalist in Greco-Roman wrestling in 1980, competing for the Soviet Union. He won gold medals at the 1978 and 1981 World Wrestling Championships.

References

1954 births
Living people
People from Ozurgeti
Soviet male sport wrestlers
Olympic wrestlers of the Soviet Union
Wrestlers at the 1980 Summer Olympics
Male sport wrestlers from Georgia (country)
Olympic gold medalists for the Soviet Union
Olympic medalists in wrestling
Honoured Masters of Sport of the USSR
Medalists at the 1980 Summer Olympics

Recipients of the Presidential Order of Excellence